Seeking a Sanctuary: Seventh-day Adventism and the American Dream is a book about the Seventh-day Adventist Church coauthored by Malcolm Bull and Keith Lockhart.

Overview 
Lockhart was born into an Adventist family, became a member of the church through baptism, and studied theology at Newbold College (where he later taught) and religion at Andrews University. Bull was also born into an Adventist family and spent one year at Newbold College, but never officially joined the church. Lockhart works as a freelance journalist, and Bull as a lecturer at the University of Oxford.

References

External links 

 "The Art of Expression", book chapter (1st edn.) reprinted in Spectrum 20:1 (1989), 14–23
 "Authority and Identity", book chapter (2nd edn.) reprinted in Spectrum 34 (Autumn 2006), 35–50
 "Looking at Adventism", an interview of Keith Lockhart by Julius Nam, Record March 17, 2007, p8–9.
 Malcolm Bull's staff profile at Oxford University
 Title search for "Seeking a Sanctuary" in the Seventh-day Adventist Periodical Index (SDAPI)

Books about Christianity
Seventh-day Adventist media
2006 books